The 1930 Haskell Indians football team was an American football that represented the Haskell Institute (now known as Haskell Indian Nations University) during the 1930 college football season. In its second year under head coach William Henry Dietz, the team compiled a 9–1 record. Louis Weller was the team captain.

Schedule

References

Haskell
Haskell Indian Nations Fighting Indians football seasons
Haskell Indians football